Kamal Ram, VC (17 December 19241 July 1982) was an Indian recipient of the Victoria Cross, the highest and most prestigious award for gallantry in the face of the enemy that can be awarded to British and Commonwealth forces. He was the second-youngest Indian recipient of the award. He was from the Gurjar community.

Life 

Kamal Ram was born into a Gurjar family on 17 December 1924, in the village of Bholupura, Karauli district, British India (now in Rajasthan, India). His father's name was Shiv Chand. During the Second World War, he served in the 3rd Battalion, 8th Punjab Regiment, British Indian Army (now the 3rd Battalion, Baloch Regiment, Pakistan Army). He was 19 years old, with the rank of Sepoy, when, on 12 May 1944, his battalion assaulted the formidable German defences of the Gustav Line, across the River Gari in Italy; and he performed the deeds for which he was awarded the VC.
 The citation reads as follows:

King George VI presented him with the medal in Italy in 1944. He remained in the Indian Army post-independence, rising to the rank of Havildar (sergeant) before receiving a promotion to Jemadar (now Naib subedar) on 18 May 1960, and further promotions to Subedar on 1 March 1964 and to Subedar-major on 1 January 1970. He retired in 1972 with the rank of Honorary Lieutenant, and died in 1982.

The medal 

His Victoria Cross is on display in the Lord Ashcroft Gallery at the Imperial War Museum, London.

References

Bibliography

External links 

Kamal Ram
Burial location

Indian World War II recipients of the Victoria Cross
1924 births
1982 deaths
People from Karauli district
Gurjar
Indian Army personnel of World War II
Rajasthani people